Yuwanjana Jawaharlal Wanasundera Wijayatilake PC was the 44th Attorney General of Sri Lanka and 43rd Solicitor General of Sri Lanka.

Wijayatilake became an attorney in 1979 and joined the legal department as an Acting State Counsel in 1980.

Having previously served as the deputy solicitor General and additional solicitor general. He was appointed Solicitor General in 2012, succeeding Palitha Fernando. In 2014 Wijayatilake was made Attorney General of Sri Lanka and served until January 2016 when he retired from the Attorney-General's Department.

Wijayatilake is the son and nephew of the former Supreme Court Justices S. R. Wijayatilake and Raja Wanasundera respectively.

References

W
W
Alumni of Ananda College